Iron oxychloride is the inorganic compound with the formula FeOCl.  This purple solid adopts a layered  structure, akin to that of cadmium chloride.  The material slowly hydrolyses in moist air.  The solid intercalates electron donors such as tetrathiafulvalene and even pyridine to give mixed valence charge-transfer salts. Intercalation is accompanied by a marked increase in electrical conductivity and a color change to black.

Production
Fe2O3  +  FeCl3   →   3 FeOCl

FeCl3 ⋅ 6H2O  →    FeOCl  +  5 H2O + 2 HCl

References 

Chlorides
Iron(III) compounds
Metal halides
Oxychlorides